Jeffrey William Titford (born 24 October 1933) is a British politician who served as leader of the UK Independence Party (UKIP) from 2000 until 2002. He served again as interim leader in September to November 2010, following the resignation of Lord Pearson of Rannoch. He was also a Member of the European Parliament (MEP) for the East of England from 1999 to 2009.

Before joining UKIP he had been at various times a member of the Conservative Party (for whom he was a local councillor), the New Britain Party and the Referendum Party. He was the most successful Referendum Party candidate in the 1997 general election, winning nearly 10 percent of the vote in Harwich. Later that year he joined UKIP.

In 1999, Titford became one of the first UKIP representatives to win a seat in the European Parliament. UKIP's then leader, Michael Holmes, resigned in 2000 amidst serious infighting. Titford narrowly won the ensuing leadership election, promising to reunite the party and restore its effectiveness as a campaigning organisation. This he largely succeeded in doing. The Guardian newspaper described him in 2001 as "an emollient man, a sort of Willie Whitelaw figure, and an ideal leader for such a fractious party". He led UKIP into the 2001 general election, in which it stood more than 420 candidates but failed to make any breakthroughs (although it did consolidate its position as the largest of the smaller parties). Titford stepped down as party leader in October 2002, in order to allow his successor time to plan his strategy for the 2004 European elections. He also wanted to spend more time on political campaigns in the East of England, where he continued to be an active MEP. He was re-elected with a greatly increased share of the vote in the 2004 European elections. At this election, UKIP also returned a second MEP, Tom Wise.

At the 2005 general election, Titford again contested Harwich. He came fourth of six candidates, polling 2,314 votes, a share of 4.6%, losing his deposit. Titford stepped down from the European Parliament at the 2009 European elections. He and Wise were succeeded as UKIP MEPs for the East of England by David Campbell-Bannerman and Stuart Agnew.

Titford is regarded by many in UKIP as the nearest the party has to an elder statesman. In October 2005, UKIP's leader Roger Knapman announced that he was appointing Titford as party chairman for an interim period.

Before entering politics he was a businessman. He was president of the National Association of Funeral Directors.

References

External links

Profile at European Parliament website

1933 births
Living people
UK Independence Party parliamentary candidates
Referendum Party politicians
People from West Mersea
Leaders of the UK Independence Party
UK Independence Party MEPs
MEPs for England 1999–2004
MEPs for England 2004–2009
Conservative Party (UK) politicians
British Eurosceptics